Thiago Carleto Alves (born 24 March 1989), known as Thiago Carleto or simply Carleto, is a Brazilian footballer who plays as a left back.

Club career

Santos
Born in São Bernardo do Campo, Carleto joined Santos' youth setup in 2000, aged ten. On 11 April 2007, he made his first team debut by coming on as a substitute for fellow youth graduate Dionísio in a 2–0 Campeonato Paulista home win against Juventus-SP.

Back to the under-20s for the remainder of the year, Carleto only featured in one further match for the main squad: a 1–1 Série A home draw against Palmeiras on 13 October 2007. The following 25 January, after impressing in the year's Copa São Paulo de Futebol Júnior, he was definitely promoted to the main squad.

Carleto was a regular starter during the 2008 Paulistão, overcoming longtime incumbent Kléber.

Valencia
On 26 November 2008, Carleto agreed to a five-and-a-half-year contract with La Liga side Valencia CF. He only made his debut abroad the following 14 February, replacing injured Emiliano Moretti in a 1–1 La Liga home draw against Málaga CF.

On 20 August 2009, Carleto was loaned to Segunda División side Elche CF for the season. He scored his first professional goal on 13 September, netting his team's first in a 2–2 draw at UD Salamanca.

São Paulo and loans
On 18 February 2010, Carleto returned to his home country after agreeing to a four-year contract with São Paulo. He made his debut for the club on 14 March, in a 2–1 defeat of Rio Branco, for the year's Paulistão.

After struggling with injuries during his first year, Carleto was loaned to Paraguayan Primera División side Olimpia for the 2011 season. After four months with unpaid wages, he terminated his link and joined América Mineiro on 6 May 2011, also in a temporary deal.

Carleto scored his first goal in the Brazilian top tier on 22 October 2011, netting the opener in a 2–2 home draw against Grêmio, and finished the season with two goals in 15 appearances, as his side suffered relegation. The following 11 January, he agreed to a one-year loan deal at Fluminense. A backup to Carlinhos, he appeared rarely as Flu was crowned champions.

Returning to Tricolor ahead of the 2013 campaign, Carleto overcame Bruno Cortez and Reinaldo, becoming a regular starter until suffering a knee injury in June. Upon returning, he served subsequent loans at Ponte Preta (where he had his deal terminated due to indiscipline problems), Avaí, Botafogo and XV de Piracicaba.

Arouca / Linense
On 10 August 2016, Portuguese side FC Arouca signed Carleto on a two-year deal. On 31 October, after only four matches, he rescinded his contract by alleging "personal problems".

On 22 December 2016, Carleto joined Linense, being a regular starter as his side reached the quarterfinals and qualified to the Série D.

Coritiba
On 15 May 2017, Carleto returned to the top tier after agreeing to a one-year contract with Coritiba. Initially a backup to William Matheus, he became an undisputed starter for Coxa during the year, being praised for his performances and winning the Bola de Prata despite his club suffering relegation.

Atlético Paranaense / Al-Ittihad
On 10 January 2018, Coritiba's fierce rivals Atlético Paranaense announced the signing of Carleto on a two-year deal. Initially a first-choice, he lost the status after the upswing of youth graduate Renan Lodi.

On 18 July 2018, Carleto moved to Saudi club Al-Ittihad, for a rumoured fee of € 1 million. The following 14 January, he terminated his contract.

Ceará / Vitória
On 16 February 2019, Carleto joined Ceará on a one-year deal. On 1 October, he signed a short-term contract with Vitória, after cutting ties with Ceará.

Career statistics

Honours

Club
Fluminense
Campeonato Brasileiro Série A: 2012
Campeonato Carioca: 2012

Botafogo
Campeonato Brasileiro Série B: 2015
  Champions League (Guanabara)

Individual
Bola de Prata: 2017

References

External links

1989 births
Living people
People from São Bernardo do Campo
Brazilian footballers
Association football defenders
Campeonato Brasileiro Série A players
Campeonato Brasileiro Série B players
Santos FC players
São Paulo FC players
América Futebol Clube (MG) players
Fluminense FC players
Associação Atlética Ponte Preta players
Avaí FC players
Botafogo de Futebol e Regatas players
Esporte Clube XV de Novembro (Piracicaba) players
Clube Atlético Linense players
Coritiba Foot Ball Club players
Club Athletico Paranaense players
Ceará Sporting Club players
Esporte Clube Vitória players
La Liga players
Segunda División players
Valencia CF players
Elche CF players
Paraguayan Primera División players
Club Olimpia footballers
Primeira Liga players
F.C. Arouca players
Saudi Professional League players
Ittihad FC players
Brazilian expatriate footballers
Brazilian expatriates in Paraguay
Brazilian expatriate sportspeople in Spain
Brazilian expatriate sportspeople in Saudi Arabia
Expatriate footballers in Paraguay
Expatriate footballers in Spain
Expatriate footballers in Saudi Arabia
Footballers from São Paulo (state)